Ann Leckie (born 2 March 1966) is an American author of science fiction and fantasy. Her 2013 debut novel Ancillary Justice, in part about artificial consciousness and gender-blindness, won the 2014 Hugo Award for "Best Novel", as well as the Nebula Award, the Arthur C. Clarke Award, and the BSFA Award. The sequels, Ancillary Sword and Ancillary Mercy, each won the Locus Award and were nominated for the Nebula Award. Provenance, published in 2017, is also set in the Imperial Radch universe. Leckie's first fantasy novel, The Raven Tower, was published in February 2019.

Career
Having grown up as a science fiction fan in St. Louis, Missouri, Leckie's attempts in her youth to get her science fiction works published were unsuccessful. One of her few publications from that time was an unattributed bodice-ripper in True Confessions.

After giving birth to her children in 1996 and 2000, boredom as a stay-at-home mother motivated her to sketch a first draft of what would become Ancillary Justice for National Novel Writing Month 2002. In 2005, Leckie attended the Clarion West Writers Workshop, where she studied under Octavia Butler. After that, she wrote Ancillary Justice over a period of six years; it was picked up by the publisher Orbit in 2012 and published the following year.

Leckie has published numerous short stories, in outlets including Subterranean Magazine, Strange Horizons, and Realms of Fantasy. Her short stories have been selected for inclusion in year's best collections, such as The Year's Best Science Fiction & Fantasy, edited by Rich Horton.

She edited the science fiction and fantasy online magazine Giganotosaurus from 2010 to 2013, and is assistant editor of the PodCastle podcast. She served as the secretary of the Science Fiction and Fantasy Writers of America from 2012 to 2013.

Imperial Radch trilogy
Leckie's debut novel Ancillary Justice, the first book of the Imperial Radch space opera trilogy, was published to critical acclaim in October 2013 and won all of the principal English-language science fiction awards (see Ann Leckie#Awards and nominations). It follows Breq, the sole survivor of a starship destroyed by treachery and vessel of that ship's artificial consciousness, as she attempts to avenge herself on the ruler of her empire.

The sequel, Ancillary Sword, was published in October 2014, and the conclusion, Ancillary Mercy, was published in October 2015. "Night's Slow Poison" (2014) and "She Commands Me and I Obey" (2014) are short stories set in the same universe.

Other novels
In 2015, Orbit Books purchased two additional novels from Leckie. The first, Provenance (published on 3 October 2017), is set in the Imperial Radch universe. The second was to have been an unrelated science fiction novel. In April 2018, Orbit announced that Leckie's first fantasy novel, The Raven Tower, would be published in early 2019.

Bibliography

Novels

Set in the Ancillary universe
Imperial Radch trilogy
Ancillary Justice. (1 October 2013). Orbit. .
Ancillary Sword. (7 October 2014). Orbit. .
Ancillary Mercy. (6 October 2015). Orbit. .
Other novels
Provenance. (26 September 2017). Orbit. .

 Translation State (forthcoming - Summer 2023)

Non-Ancillary novels
The Raven Tower. (26 February 2019). Orbit. .

Short fiction
"Hesperia and Glory". (2006). Subterranean Magazine 4. (Reprinted in Science Fiction: The Best of the Year 2007 Edition, edited by Rich Horton)
"Footprints". (2007). Postcards from Hell: The First Thirteen.
"The Snake's Wife". (2007). Helix #6. (Reprinted on Transcriptase) 
"Needle and Thread" - co-authored by Rachel Swirsky. (2008). Lone Star Stories #29. 
"The Nalendar". (2008). Andromeda Spaceways Inflight Magazine, Issue #36. (Reprinted in Uncanny Magazine #2, January 2015 and as audio on PodCastle #52, May 2009)
"Clickweed". (July 2008). A Field Guide to Surreal Botany.
"Marsh Gods". (7 July 2008). Strange Horizons.
"The God of Au". Helix #8. (Reprinted in The Year's Best Science Fiction & Fantasy, 2009, edited by Rich Horton)
"The Endangered Camp". (2009). Clockwork Phoenix 2. (Reprinted in The Year's Best Science Fiction & Fantasy, 2010, edited by Rich Horton)
"The Sad History of the Tearless Onion" (12 June 2009). PodCastle Miniature #33.
"The Unknown God". (February 2010). Realms of Fantasy.
"Beloved of the Sun". (21 October 2010). Beneath Ceaseless Skies.
"Maiden, Mother, Crone". (December 2010). Realms of Fantasy. (Reprinted in Lightspeed, January 2015 and as audio on PodCastle #500, 11 December 2017)
"The Endangered Camp". (12 March 2012). Clockwork Phoenix 2. (Reprinted in The Year's Best Science Fiction & Fantasy, 2010 and Forever Magazine, March 2015)
"Saving Bacon". (39 July 2014). PodCastle #322.
"Another Word for World". (2015). Future Visions: Original Science Fiction Stories Inspired by Microsoft.
"The Justified". (2019). The Mythic Dream.

Set in the Ancillary universe
"Night's Slow Poison". (2014). Tor. 

"She Commands Me and I Obey". (2014). Strange Horizons.

Critical studies and reviews of Leckie's work

Awards and nominations
 Ancillary Justice (2013)
 2013: won the Nebula Award for Best Novel
 2013: won the BSFA Award for Best Novel
 2013: won the Kitschies Award Golden Tentacle (Debut)
 2014: won the Hugo Award for Best Novel
 2014: won the Arthur C. Clarke Award
 2014: won the Locus Award for Best First Novel
 2014: won the British Fantasy Award for the Best Newcomer (the Sydney J. Bounds Award)
 2016: won the Seiun Award for Best Translated Novel (Japan)
 2013: Nominated for the James Tiptree, Jr. Award
 2013: Nominated for the Philip K. Dick Award
 2014: Finalist for the John W. Campbell Memorial Award for Best Science Fiction Novel
 2014: Finalist for the Compton Crook Award
 Ancillary Sword (2014)
 2014: won the BSFA Award for Best Novel
 2015: won the Locus Award for Best Science Fiction Novel
 2014: Nominated for the Nebula Award for Best Novel
 2015: Finalist for the Hugo Award for Best Novel
 Ancillary Mercy (2015)
 2016: won the Locus Award for Best Science Fiction Novel
 2015: Nominated for the Nebula Award for Best Novel
 2016: Finalist for the Hugo Award for Best Novel
 2016: Nominated for the Dragon Award for Best Science Fiction Novel
 Imperial Radch trilogy (2013–2015)
 2017:  won Grand Prix de l'Imaginaire for Best Translator (Jacques Chambon Translation Prize) for Les Chroniques du Radch, tomes 1 à 3 (France)
 2017: Nominated for Grand Prix de l'Imaginaire for Best Foreign Novel (France)
2017: Nominated for the Seiun Award for Best Translated Novel
 Provenance (2017)
 2018: Nominated for the Hugo Award for Best Novel

Personal life
Leckie earned a degree in music from Washington University in St. Louis in 1989. She has since held various jobs, including as a waitress, a receptionist, a land surveyor, a lunch lady, and a recording engineer. She is married to David Harre, with whom she has a son and daughter, and lives with her family in St. Louis, Missouri.

References

External links

 at annleckie.com

 Ann Leckie at The Encyclopedia of Science Fiction

1966 births
Living people
American science fiction writers
American women novelists
Hugo Award-winning writers
Nebula Award winners
Writers from St. Louis
Women science fiction and fantasy writers
21st-century American novelists
21st-century American women writers
Novelists from Missouri
Washington University in St. Louis alumni